Lewis Hudson is a New Zealand rugby league player who represented New Zealand (Heritage № 552).

Playing career
Hudson played for the Linwood Keas (from Linwood, Christchurch) in the Canterbury Rugby League competition, and Warrington. He amassed 1458 points for Linwood Keas over thirteen seasons with the club between 1974 and 1986. He also represented Canterbury between 1975 and 1983, scoring 190 points for his district.

He played three test matches for New Zealand between 1979 and 1982.

References

External links
Statistics at wolvesplayers.thisiswarrington.co.uk

Canterbury rugby league team players
Linwood Keas players
Living people
New Zealand national rugby league team players
New Zealand rugby league players
Rugby league centres
Warrington Wolves players
Year of birth missing (living people)